Royal Mail Ship (sometimes Steam-ship or Steamer), usually seen in its abbreviated form RMS, is the ship prefix used for seagoing vessels that carry mail under contract to the British Royal Mail. The designation dates back to 1840. Any vessel designated as "RMS" has the right both to fly the pennant of the Royal Mail when sailing and to include the Royal Mail "crown" insignia with any identifying device and/or design for the ship.

It was used by many shipping lines, but is often associated in particular with the White Star Line, Cunard Line, Royal Mail Lines, Union-Castle Line, Canadian Pacific Line, Orient Line and the P&OSNC which held a number of high-profile mail contracts, and traditionally prefixed the names of many of their ships with the initials "RMS".

While some lines in the past, particularly the Royal Mail Lines, called all their ships "RMS", technically a ship would use the prefix only while contracted to carry mail, and would revert at other times to a standard designation such as "SS".

History

Originally the British Admiralty operated these ships.

The designation "RMS" has been used since 1840. In 1850 contracts were awarded to private companies. Having the title "RMS" was seen as a mark of quality and a competitive advantage, because the mail had to be on time.

The most valuable route, with the highest volume, was between Kingstown (now Dún Laoghaire), in Ireland, and Holyhead in Wales. The City of Dublin Steam Packet Company (CDSPCo) won the contract. They bought RMS St Columba and RMS Llewellyn from the Admiralty to supplement their Prince Arthur. In the CDSPCo contract, in 1860, there was a penalty clause of £1 1s 4d for every minute's delay.

The RMS designation was also used on the ships of the White Star, P&O and Cunard lines of the 19th and 20th century.

Modern times

QM2 was conferred "RMS" by Royal Mail when she entered service in 2004 on the Southampton to New York route as a gesture to Cunard's history.

The Royal Mail continues a form of this tradition on modern day airliners. The UK's flag carrier airline, British Airways, is contracted to carry mail on some of its scheduled long-distance routes. Aircraft operating these routes with the facilities to carry mail are allowed to display the Royal Mail's logo and crest on their fuselage, usually alongside their registration markings.

Other designations
The less-common designations RMMV for Royal Mail Motor Vessel and RMMS for Royal Mail Motor Ship, were used for a period when RMS was restricted to steam-ships. Motor Vessel and Motor Ship indicated that propulsion was provided by diesel rather than steam.

The  carries the designation RMV for Royal Mail Vessel and is the only active RMV.

List of Royal Mail Ships
Service dates are the years with the status of Royal Mail Ship. Those highlighted are still in service with the status of Royal Mail Ship.

See also

 Union-Castle Line
Mail steamer
 Steamboat

Notes

References
 Kennedy, John. (1903). The History of Steam Navigation. Liverpool: C. Birchall, 1903. OCLC 3553860

External links 
 RMS Caronia "Green Goddess" Time-Line
 Titanic Archive

Packet (sea transport)
Postal infrastructure
Postal vehicles
Ship types
Ship prefixes